Keshava Malagi is an Indian Kannada language writer of the post-Bandaya generation.

Life and career
Malagi was born in 1963 in the northern region of Karnataka. He obtained his MA from Mysore University and began his career as a journalist. Malagi moved from journalism to education and joined MAYA, a Bangalore-based NGO. He now works with the Azim Premji foundation.

Literary works
Malagi's works began to be published in 1986.  was one of his early stories. The novel  appeared in 1990. His collection of stories  earned him the Karnataka Sahitya Akademi book prize in 2005. Malagi's novels and stories are known for their use of lyricism and sentimentalism as a style. His stories can be classified into three major types. The first type explores man-woman relationship in the modern world. The second one deals with the struggles of women in today's society and the question of social justice.

His novel  has been acclaimed as a major work in Kannada literature. It deals with the story of Siddharama, a PhD student, who opts out of research to become a monk. Siddharama eschews worldliness, but his well-meaning acts creates effects which are against his wishes. A group of devotees are attracted towards him, which soon turns into a big patron-base. A large religious establishment with affiliate schools, colleges and charity organizations starts growing around him in his name. But Siddharama is helpless and remains a mute spectator. At last abandons the establishment and leaves the place to make a fresh beginning.

Malagi has received many awards for his fiction, including a gold medal from Gulbarga University. He has also received the Pavem Acharya award, Sapna Book House-Kannada Prabha short Story award, and Lankesh Patrike Short Story award.

He has awarded a Senior Fellowship in the field of literature from Ministry of Culture, Government of India, for the year 2008–09.

Works

Short story collections

Novels

Others
  (Boris Pasternak, a reader)
  – children's novelette
  (a collection of lyrical and personal essays)
  – narration of Kandar air hostage crisis
 Translations of B R Ambedkar and Babu Jagajeevana Ram works
  (French Literature)
  (French Literature)

References

External links
https://web.archive.org/web/20160303211917/http://saadhaara.com/themes/article/unicode/kannada/111/2/doresani_keshavamalagi_uni.htm

https://web.archive.org/web/20110720192656/http://thatskannada.oneindia.in/literature/short-story/2004/291004keshavmalagi.html
https://web.archive.org/web/20010224134051/http://www.sahitya-akademi.org/sahitya-akademi/lit11.htm

1963 births
Living people
Indian communists
Writers from Karnataka
Kannada-language writers
University of Mysore alumni